The 1936 Auckland Rugby League season was its 28th. The Fox Memorial was won by Manukau in their first season back in the senior A grade as a stand-alone club since the early 1910s. They also won the Roope Rooster competition when they defeated City Rovers 23 to 10 in the final. Richmond Rovers finished runners up in the Fox Memorial and earned the right to play Manukau for the Stormont Shield. Richmond won the trophy after beating Manukau 30–9 in the Stormont Shield clash. Richmond also won the Phelan Shield after they had been knocked out of the Roope Rooster in the first round. They beat Marist Old Boys 13–9 in the final.

By accumulating the most points in the second round of the Fox competition Ponsonby United won the Thistle Cup. Mount Albert United won the senior reserve championship (Norton Cup) which was the first senior title in their history. Marist won the reserve grade knockout competition (Stallard Cup). The senior B grade (Sharman Cup) was won by Papakura who went unbeaten throughout the season. They also won the Walmsley Shield by going unbeaten in the extra round played for that trophy. Point Chevalier won the senior B knockout competition after they defeated Green Lane 22–9 in the final.

Auckland played 3 representative fixtures with the first 2 played on the same day, when they fielded 2 teams against separate opponents. The opposition was Tāmaki (Auckland Māori) who they lost to 30-21, and Wellington who they beat 25–22. The highlight of their season was the match against the touring Great Britain played in front of 14,000 at Carlaw Park. Great Britain had recently spent 8 weeks in Australia where they won the test series 2-1 and 14 of their 17 tour matches. Auckland played well but went down 16–22.

Aside from their match with Auckland, the Tāmaki (Auckland Māori) team played Waikato Māori on June 15 and lost 30–43 at Te Kohanga, and had a win over Northland Māori (Takahiwai) 39–15 in a match for the Waitangi Shield. Jack Hemi, the New Zealand Māori rugby representative had switched codes and played all 3 matches for them. They were scheduled to play a fourth match against Waikato Māori for the Waitangi Shield but owing to the awful weather around that time, and the desire to protect the Carlaw Park surface from any further damage before the touring Great Britain sides matches the game was cancelled.

Auckland Rugby League meetings and news

Annual meeting
On February 26 the ARL met to discuss several issues and to decide on an approximate date for the annual meeting. It was recommended to play a benefit match for Jim Laird of the Marist Old Boys who had been in hospital suffering from a leg injury since the New Zealand – Australia match late in the previous season. It was also stressed that the percentage of money earned given to clubs should increase so that they can promote increased organisation in the sport. Mr. D. Wilkie said it was felt that senior clubs were not catering sufficiently for juniors and the junior board considered that the constitution should compel each club to have at least three junior teams. On March 25 at a board of control meeting several clubs were reported to have altered their uniforms following last year's official suggestion due to colour clashes in many matches.

The annual general meeting was held on April 6. Mr. G. Grey Campbell stated that “if the rugby league public, clubs and players were enthusiastic last year, they are now more than doubly so; in fact, abounding with a confidence that augurs well for the approaching season”. Mr. Harold Walmsley was in attendance and was thanked for his generosity with rugby league for many years and for donating his 21st trophy to the game which would be known as the Tracy Inglis football. Dr. Inglis had been associated with the game as a prominent medical officer. It was later decided to allocate the trophy as an award for junior clubs only for competition on similar lines to the Davis Points Shield.

The following officers were elected to the board:- Patron, Mr. J.B. Donald; vice-patron, Mr. J.F.W. Dickson; president, John A. Lee (M.P.); vice presidents, Messrs. E. Davis, R.D. Bagnall, J. Bellamy, R. Benson, O. Blackwood, John Donald, C. Drysdale, H. Grange, R.J. Laird, W.J. Lovett, E. Montgomery, T.G. Symonds, Joe Sayegh, C. Seagar, Bill Schram (M.P.), W. Wallace, H. Walmsley, R.H. Wood, G.T. Wright, and H.W. Brien; chairman, Mr. G. Grey Campbell; vice-chairman, Ted Phelan; club delegates on the control board, Messrs. Jim Rukutai and J.W. Probert; referee delegate, Mr. W. Mincham; junior board delegate, Mr. D. Wilkie. At the meeting of the control board which followed the following appointments were confirmed:- Hon. secretary, Mr. Ivan Culpan; hon. treasurer, Mr. J.E. Knowling; hon. solicitor, Mr. H.M. Rogerson; hon. Physicians, Drs. Tracy Inglis, M.G. Pezaro, F.J. Gwynne, K.H. Holdgate, J.N. Waddell, H. Burrell and G.W. Lock; hon. masseur, Mr. F. Flanagan; auditor, Mr. R.A. Spinley; Press steward, Mr. R. Doble; referees’ appointment board delegate, Mr. L. Binns; New Zealand Council delegate, Mr. R. Doble; finance committee, the chairman, secretary and Messrs. J.W. Probert and W. Mincham; insurance committee, Messrs. Doble, Binns and D Wilkie; emergency committee, chairman, secretary and Mr. Jim Rukutai; grounds chairman, secretary and Mr. Binns.

The gross receipts were £3,298 13s 9d and were an increase of £500 on the previous season. During the season ground rents due to the hire of Carlaw Park were increased by £71 17s 6d. Players benefited by insurance to the extent of £70 17s. The greatest increase in expenditure was maintenance of Carlaw Park, which amounted to £353 6s 6d. A sum of £520 was granted to senior clubs as gate percentages, which was a record since clubs had benefited from such payments.

It was decided to begin the season on the 18th of April and a “substantial portion” of the gate would be donated to Jim Laird, the Marist player who was still recovering from an injury received playing for New Zealand the previous season. Senior premiership matches would start on May 2. On September 12 during the break between Roope Rooster games at Carlaw Park John A. Lee was presented with a silver mounted oak inkstand by officials of Auckland Rugby League. Lee was an M.P. and was being elevated to Parliamentary Under-Secretary in charge of the State housing scheme. This required him to spend a lot more time in Wellington and he would be relinquishing the presidency of Auckland Rugby League at the end of the season. Lee said “I love the game and I like the people associated with it”... “what ever can do for the league code will be done, not because of politics, but because I love league football”.  Ivan Culpan was then presented with a dressing table set for his work making all the ground arrangements at Carlaw Park throughout the recent English tour. Mr. Culpan said that his work for the league since he became secretary in 1918 had been his hobby.

Honours board
At the annual meeting on April 6 it was decided to compile and hang and honours board at the ARL head office. It would include the names of all “living officials who have a record of 25 years and over in the service of the code in Auckland”. Those present at the meeting who would qualify were William Mincham, Messrs. E.K. Asher (City Rovers) and A. Ferguson (Devonport), 27 years; Jim Rukutai (control board) and William James Liversidge (NZ Council), 26 years; Ivan Culpan (ARL secretary), and Pro. Henry (Newton Rangers), 25 years. The board was being donated by Mr. R.H. Wood who was thanked at a board of control meeting on April 15. It was decided to write to all clubs asking them to "supply the names of members or officials who have 25 years' record of active connection with the game in playing and official capacity".

Carlaw Park
At the February 26 meeting of the ARL the board agreed to erect higher goal posts at Carlaw Park. They also decided to make permanent accommodation there for the Mount Albert United Club. Chairman Campbell at the pre-season ARL meeting said that the ground space had extended the ground space by 12 feet in width by the setting back of the picket fence at the foot of the terrace which meant “the danger of players being thrown against the terrace fence had been greatly minimised”. They had also formed steps behind the stand leading to the hill. The turf has also been top dressed, and made more even than it had formerly been. It was also discussed that a round of night games in early April could be played and this was supported by several delegates. A by-law had come into place whereby "theatres and other places of amusement capable of seating 500 or more people" would have to have firemen in attendance. In the past the by-law did not operate in regards to sports organisations. From May 1 firemen would be supplied directly by the Auckland Metropolitan Fire Board. New Zealand was transitioning to a 40-hour work week meaning that many people would no longer be working half days on Saturday. Mr. G. Grey Campbell said if Saturday were a universal holiday the league would “undoubtedly take full advantage of it. Reserve grade games might well be played in the morning. Furthermore, opportunity could be taken to have senior B matches played on Saturday morning at Carlaw Park” which had been a difficulty up to this point. The grounds executive submitted a report to the board that a start had been made by May 20 on the formation of tea rooms near the grandstand as part of the programme of improvements in preparation for the visit of the British team. It was reported at the May 27 meeting of the board of control that Mr. Early had donated a board for display at Carlaw Park which would show the senior team placings in the competition from week to week. It was reported at the same meeting that after 4 rounds the gate takings were far in excess of anything since 1931. It was decided at a meeting on June 1 to purchase special whistles for referees on the #2 field because there was sometimes confusion when a whistle was blown as to which field it related to.

Senior team prospects for the season
On April 13 the Auckland Star reported on various teams prospects for the season. The New Zealand Herald did the same on April 29. Marist had secured Mr. Con Hall as selector/coach to replace Charles Gregory. Gregory was moving to an outer district and would not be able to do commute. Hall had been a national selector the previous season and was leaving the West Coast. They would still have Dan Keane, J Woods, Carter, Breed (formerly of Otahuhu Rovers), and hooker O’Kane, with John Anderson the West Coast Rugby League representative forward joining their ranks. Norm Campbell, Vincent Bakalich, Sidney Loader, Furlonger, George Kerr, James Chalmers and William Glover would also be on hand to play in the backs. Aro was joining them from the Technical Old Boys rugby club.

Richmond Rovers were losing Bert Cooke who was retiring and moving to coach Ponsonby United. They were acquiring George Tittleton, the international player from the Waikato along with his brother Walter, they would play alongside Eric Fletcher and Roy Powell with Ted Mincham, Alf Mitchell, E McNeil and Noel Bickerton also in the backs. The forwards were rumoured to see Bill Telford, the Satherley brothers (Jack and Cliff), Alfred Broadhead, Harold Tetley and Ray Lawless along with Hadley who was returning from the Foster Club in Australia. Though Lawless did not play in 1936.

City Rovers would again be led by outstanding New Zealand player Lou Brown. City were adding former South Auckland rugby union hooker Lapwood to the forwards where he would join Stan Clark, J Herring, McLaughlan, James Dye, Steve Watene, John Magee, and Bowman. Harry Wayne was returning from Taranaki (though he a short time later moved to South Africa), and Jack Rata was joining from South Auckland rugby (Tuakau) along with Allen, the Waikato rugby fullback. Ex-Wairarapa player Ford was also expected to join City’s ranks. Cyril Wiberg, J Tawhai, Arthur Porteous, J Thompson were likely to make up the backs. Porteous was moving across from the Marist rugby side, though he had previously played for Newton Rangers.

Newton Rangers, holders of the Roope Rooster trophy were confident of success and would be wearing new uniforms supplied by the St Helens club in England via former players who were playing there. Claude Dempsey would be in the backs again along with P. Young, the Brimble brothers, Sissons (promoted from the juniors), H. Brady, and Schlesinger. Knott from the Ponsonby rugby team was also joining the backs. In the forwards R. Johnson, R. Middleton, A. Nathan, Clemm, Watson and Kelsall would play, with Ginders transferring from Richmond with Lou Hutt joining from Ponsonby. Emanuel, Merrick (returning from North Auckland), and Mackin would also be in the forward pack with a brother of Mount Albert’s R. Shadbolt joining. Watson from Northern Wairoa rugby and a Hawke’s Bay representative would be another addition to the pack.

Mount Albert performed brilliantly in their first ever season in the season finishing runners-up. Tom Haddon was selector again and it was understood that international player T. Campbell would lead the reserve grade side. H Flannagan, Des Herring, Constable, J Gunning and Richard Shadbolt would be in the forwards again with Peterson, the Hawke’s Bay rugby representative joining the loose forwards. Other players joining Mount Albert included Elwin from Manukau rugby, J. O’Brien from South Auckland (Waikato) along with “several others”. They had also gained the services of Watkins’ the Grafton rugby halfback. Len Schultz was re-joining the side from York in England with Pawson rumoured to be joining from South Auckland. Bill Schultz would play on one wing with Halsey joining from the Otahuhu senior B side. Robert Morrissey would again be in the fullback position.

Ponsonby were being coached by Bert Cooke. Arthur Kay, Brian Riley and Frank Halloran would again be in the backs. Devonport United were rumoured to be gathering their best team for several years and had former New Zealand international Bert Laing in charge of their senior side. E. Morgan who had played for Grammar Old Boys was also changing codes as was Davis, from the Grafton club, he had been a member of the Auckland B team. Dreaver and Blood were also named as two promising young forwards. Another player to switch codes and join Ponsonby was Frank Paton.

Devonport saw the return of backs C Rhodes, J Cowan, C Hall, and Len Scott. They were being strengthened by the inclusion of Gordon, a junior rugby five-eighth. Kennedy, Greenwood and Parkinson were also joining the side from the rugby ranks. In the forwards Reg Hallows was another rugby convert from Northland and was joining first team regulars John Donald, Simpson, H Hunt, Tony Milicich, L Sowter, and E Scott.

Non-replacement rule
Following a decision by the New Zealand Council that the non-replacement rule be enforced the Auckland Rugby League was forced to adhere to it more stringently. Previously teams would be allowed to replace an injured player in the first half but the rule was now being brought into line with the way it was enforced in England where no player may be replaced at all. Considerable debate took place at the meeting with Jim Rukutai and Mr. J.W. Probert saying that “the present rule allowing replacements up to half-time seemed to be working well”. Rukutai said that “the enforcement of the rule might spoil matters and be a handicap”. Mr. Doble said that the enforcement of the rule might “do considerable good and compel increased fitness by players and teams”. Chairman Campbell said it would be unfair to “spring the rules on the clubs Saturday”, so it was decided to bring the rule in for the round 4 matches the week after. At the May 20 meeting of the control board four clubs (Newton Rangers, Ponsonby United, Devonport United, and Marist Old Boys) all wrote letters strongly opposing the rule. The other clubs were also against the rule, as were the schools’ management and the junior control board. All who spoke were in agreement that the league could use its discretion and not apply the rule to club competition and that the rule should only be used for representative matches. Mr. Doble suggested that they trial the rule that weekend and then apply for dispensation but chairman Campbell said that “the risk of upsetting the games and the public was too great. It was preferable in the circumstances to offend the council than for games to be spoilt for the public through becoming one-sided as the result of any injury to players”. It was then decided to rescind the rule change.

Admission of Manukau Rovers club into the senior competition
At the ARL control board meeting on April 29 the Manukau Rovers were admitted to the senior championship first grade competition. This was their first appearance in it since 1913 though they did field a combined team with a Mangere club in 1924 before switching en masse to the rugby code the same year. In 1932 the club was revived but mainly fielded teams in the junior grades. Jack Hemi and Joe Broughton left the rugby union code where they were playing for Wairarapa, and Horowhenua - Manawatu respectively and joined the Manukau club prior to the start of the season. Both were representative players with Hemi also having played for the Maori All Blacks. Thomas Trevarthan then joined the team for their second round match. Trevarthan was a rugby player from Otago and he went on the represent New Zealand in his debut league season. In addition Len Kawe, Angus Gault, and Frank Pickrang all King County rugby representatives joined Manukau early in the season. Towards the end of the season Manukau signed Jack Brodrick who was honoured with the best forward award following the New Zealand Maori rugby union tour of Australia. Tragedy struck Manukau immediately following their first win of the season against Richmond in round 2. Mr. Albert Cowan, who had founded the team joined them in the dressing room to congratulate them but collapsed and could not be revived. The players and patrons were “distressed when the news was confirmed, and flags lowered to half-mast. The Manukau reserve team which was playing a later game at the Domain found out during their match which was then abandoned.

Junior insurance scheme
A compulsory junior insurance scheme, controlled by the ARL was to be brought in for the 1936 season. Mr. Wilkie said that clubs had been involved in its idea and implementation. It would involve an increase in the player registration fee and see insurance and the first doctor’s expenses met.

Broadcasting of matches
It was decided to continue broadcasting matches prior to the commencement of the season. On May 30 (round 5) the first of the matches was broadcast on 1ZB. The Friendly Road station had been off air for some time for “urgent repairs and overhaul”. “Griffo”, who was the station's sports announcer, was to be the commentator.

Annual prize-giving
On the 16th of November the Auckland Rugby League held their annual prize giving at the Auckland Town Hall. Mr. E.J. Phelan congratulated the players and officials on the season and paid tribute to the championship winning Manukau side. Mr. G. Grey Campbell said that it was a pleasure to be associated with the clubs this season and thanked the control board for the “earnest co-operation of club officials [and that] the valuable assistance rendered by the ladies’ committee was a feature of the successful social side of the Auckland League's activities. Mr. Phelan then presented the trophies and caps won by teams and players.

Obituaries

Arthur Singe
Arthur Singe played for Marist Old Boys in 1921, and again from 1924 to 1926 after a spell out of Auckland for work. He made 48 appearances for them in total and scored 140 points from 22 tries and 37 goals. Singe originally played rugby union, representing the Marist Old Boys rugby club after returning from World War 1. He had represented the New Zealand Army side which played a large number of games in Europe late in the war and after it had ceased. Singe was a fast wing forward who was regularly hailed as a “match winner” and widely considered to be a brilliant footballer. He toured South Africa with the NZ Army side on their way back to New Zealand in 1919. In 1920 Singe represented Auckland at rugby in 8 matches along with 1 appearance for the North Island side, and was considered unlucky not to make the New Zealand team. Soon after missing selection he switched to rugby league. He represented Auckland 15 times from 1921 to 1926. Singe was selected to play for New Zealand in 1925 against the touring Queensland side, and was then chosen for the ill-fated 1926-27 tour of England and Wales. Singe was part of a group of players who refused to play at two points of the tour due to their objection to the selections and coaching of Ernest Mair. Upon his return he, along with the other strikers was banned from rugby league for life. Singe had received a life ban from rugby union for switching to rugby league and so could no longer play in either code. In 1962 the New Zealand Rugby League administration lifted the ban on Singe and his 6 teammates however Singe had been dead for 26 years by this time. Singe died on January 5, 1936, after suffering ill health likely related to the war and was buried at Waikumete Cemetery.

Thomas Wells
Thomas (William Godfrey) Wells had arrived in Auckland around 1929 and became a delegate for the Parnell club on their junior and senior management committees of the ARL. He was killed in a motorcycle accident on Franklin Road, Ponsonby on March 14 when his motorcycle veered off the road and crashed into a tree. He “received the full force of the impact on his head”, and was taken away in an ambulance to Auckland Hospital but was pronounced dead on arrival. He was married with no children and aged just 36. He was buried at Hillsborough Cemetery on March 17.

Albert Cowan
On May 9 Mr. Albert Askin Cowan collapsed and died in the Manukau dressing room following their win against Richmond at Carlaw Park. He was a founder of the Manukau side and their secretary, and was absolutely instrumental along with Puti Tipene Watene in the rebuilding of the club in recent seasons. He had been a “keen stalwart of the rugby league code for many years, and was responsible for the organisation of the Ellerslie United and Otahuhu Rovers clubs when Ellerslie attained senior rank”. He was also a member of the Manukau Cruising Club. Mr. Cowan was born in Port Chalmers in 1880, and resided at Selwyn Street, South Onehunga. He was “survived by Mrs. Cowan, a son who is an invalid and two daughters”. He was 57 years of age. Cowan's funeral was held on the morning of May 12 in Onehunga at the Church of the Assumption. Over 50 vehicles made up the cortege with the pall-bearers Messrs, G. Love, Angus Gault, Steve Watene, and G. Zanovich. All sections of the Auckland Rugby League were represented, including Mr. G. Grey Campbell and E.J. Phelan.

John Stormont
John Stormont died in September. He was a trustee of Auckland Rugby League for 8 years and was a part donor of the Stormont Memorial Shield in honour of his son who played for the New Zealand side and died aged 26 from rheumatic heart disease in 1925. When news reached the meeting of the ARL Mr. Campbell said “the passing of such a widely respected citizen and trustee of the game in this city would be widely deplored. John Stormont was aged 73 and was survived by his wife and seven sons.

Special opening matches
On April 18 a special round of matches were played to open the season. The proceeds were divided between the clubs and a benefit fund for Jim Laird, the Marist international player who was injured in a New Zealand match late in the 1935 season. In the match between Richmond and Mount Albert, a Richmond forward was ordered off (though the newspapers did not state who the player was) and was suspended for four weeks. There were four matches played at Carlaw Park. The Manukau senior side had yet to be admitted at this point and so Devonport played the Pukemiro team from the South Auckland league. The same weekend Papakura defeated Point Chevalier in a pre-season match at Papakura by 38 points to 5. Former rugby representative player, Reginald Haslam was on debut for Marist after switching codes. He would represent Auckland in a match later in the season.

Matches
The match between Marist and Newton was refereed by Percy Rogers who was refereeing at least his 100th senior grade match since his debut in 1924. Dye of the City side received a bad head injury and was taken to Auckland Hospital suffering from concussion. He was able to return to work on the Tuesday. For Richmond in their match with Mount Albert, R. Couper injured his knee which had previously caused him trouble.

Fox Memorial Shield (senior championship)

Fox Memorial standings
{|
|-
|

Fox Memorial results

Round 1
The round 1 matches were played at Carlaw Park in rain with occasional hail. There was some controversy at the end of the match between Marist and City. Sidney Loader scored a try for Marist with time up but the ball was still in play which won them the match. City protested the result believing too much time had been played but the time keeper gave a detailed description of why time had been added and City accepted the result. Manukau in their first game in the senior A grade for decades played well in the first half and only trailed 3–2 at half time before falling away and losing 27–2.

Round 2
Following the Manukau win over Richmond, Mr. Albert Cowan, one of the founders of the Manukau senior side entered their dressing room to congratulate the team. Whilst there he suffered a fatal heart attack and was unable to be revived. The 3pm kickoff games were underway and the flags were lowered to half mast. News of his death reached the nearby Domain where the reserve matches were taking place. Upon hearing of his death the Manukau reserve team game was stopped. During Manukau's game at Carlaw Park international Cliff Satherley was concussed and taken to Auckland Hospital.

Round 3
New Zealand international Eric Fletcher had to leave the field for Richmond with a foot injury. It was to be his last ever appearance in rugby league as he moved back to Palmerston North and was reinstated to rugby union. He finished the season playing several matches for Manawatu before retiring and taking up representative golf. His younger brother Keith joined the Richmond senior side soon afterwards.

Round 4

Round 5

Round 6
The City v Mount Albert match was played at Prince Edward Park in Papakura. Pawson left the field during the match with an ankle injury and then Halliwell was knocked out by a late tackle in the first half and was unconscious for “three quarters of an hour”. Jack Hemi injured his knee playing for Manukau and had to leave the field. The injury saw him miss several weeks.

Round 7

Round 8
After a remarkable 4 and a half year absence, former Kiwi Craddock Dufty turned out for City at the age of 36. He scored 47 points over the remainder of the season which meant he was the 6th highest point scorer for the season. During the Manukau and Devonport match George Kerr had to leave the field with 15 minutes remaining with a leg injury. For Ponsonby Payne was carried from the field near fulltime with a side injury.

Round 9

Round 10
Moate debuted for Manukau. It was his first game of rugby league as he had switched codes, previously represented East Coast in rugby union and was a five-eighth. In the final minute of the game he beat 4 defenders to score with Watene's conversion giving Manukau the win.

Round 11
Following the Devonport v Newton match A. Nathan of the Newton side was involved in an “incident” in the dressing room area and as a result was suspended for the remainder of the season and all of the 1937 season. The other player involved from Devonport (who was never named) was “exonerated”. Over the coming months the Newton club appealed the suspension to both the ARL and the New Zealand Council but the suspension was upheld. Conditions were atrocious for all of the games but by the time of the 3pm kickoffs the fields were covered in mud and water. In the Ponsonby v Mount Albert match the referee stopped the game to admit that he could not tell the teams apart so requested that they stay onside. Players were even running off the field to wash their eyes in buckets of water.

Round 12
Jack Hemi returned to play for Manukau after a 4-week absence due to injury. It was reported that following the Auckland v Great Britain match at Carlaw Park the week previous that the Manukau side had met to discuss what they had seen and learned from the match. Maurice Wetherill was refereeing his 50th first grade match since his debut in 1933 after retiring from playing. He became the 6th referee to achieve the feat.

Round 13
The City v Mount Albert and Ponsonby v Newton matches were both postponed due to the weather. The Ponsonby-Newton match was to be played at Stafford Park in Northcote. The number 2 field at Carlaw Park was covered in sheets of water so the reserve grade match due to be played there and the City-Mount Albert game were not able to be played. The weather was so bad that the 2 lone spectators sitting in the uncovered terraces were invited across the field to join those under cover in the railway stand.

Round 14
It was decided that the 2 postponed matches from round 13 would only be played if necessary. Going into the final round of matches the points table saw the following points for each team: Manukau 17, Richmond 16, Devonport 16, Mount Albert 15, Ponsonby 12, Marist 11, City 9, and Newton 4. Mount Albert, Ponsonby, City and Newton all had played one less game but after the final round of matches Manukau progressed to 19 competition points with their easy 26–6 win over Newton. Richmond trailed them by 1 point but had completed all of their matches while Devonport were 2 points further back so had no chance of overhauling Manukau therefore the 2 postponed matches were not necessary and thus the Fox Memorial for 1936 had been decided with Manukau winning their first ever title. The round also saw the debut of A. Beyer for Richmond. He had previously represented Auckland at rugby union.

Roope Rooster (knockout competition)
It was decided to admit the Senior B champion side Papakura once again. This meant that nine teams were in the competition and Papakura drew the bye in the first round.

Round 1
The City v Newton match went to extra time as the score was locked at 15–15 at full time. Two five minute spells were played and the deadlock was broken when Craddock Dufty kicked a penalty goal from the side line. Marist fielded Andrew Fletcher of the Grammar Old Boys rugby club and Clive Murdoch of the Technical Old Boys club. Verdun Scott played for Devonport and kicked 3 goals. He later went on to become a test cricketer for New Zealand and is the only dual rugby league and cricket representative in New Zealand's history.

Semi-finals
With five teams remaining Devonport drew the bye. The Papakura v Manukau match was played at Prince Edward Park, Papakura's home ground. Steve Watene, the Manukau captain said after the match that they had “cause to thank [their] fitness for saving defeat” and that his team had been completely surprised by the form Papakura had shown.

Major semi-final
As there were three teams remaining in the competition a draw was made which saw Manukau receive a bye and direct entry to the final.

Final

Phelan Shield
The Phelan Shield was played for by the teams which had been knocked out of the Roope Rooster in the first round. They were however joined in later rounds by the likes of Papakura and Devonport who had been knocked out of the Roope Rooster competition in later rounds.

Round 1

Semi-finals

Major semi-final
Marist were awarded a bye with three teams remaining in the Phelan Shield and progressed directly to the final.

Final

Stormont Shield

Top try scorers and point scorers
The point scoring lists are compiled from matches played in the Opening round of matches, the Fox Memorial, Roope Rooster, Phelan Shield and Stormont Shield matches which all first grade sides were eligible for competing in (provided they avoided elimination from the knock out competitions). Lou Brown after returning from playing professionally in England once again topped the try scoring lists. The top point scorer was John Anderson who had joined the Auckland competition after moving from the West Coast of the South Island. Remarkably Craddock Dufty featured on the top point scorer lists after a 5 year absence from playing, and in his 36th year in a competition dominated by players around 10 years his junior.

Senior reserve (Norton Cup)

Reserve grade standings
The Richmond match with Manukau was abandoned with Richmond leading after news arrived that Cowan (a Manukau official) had died earlier in the afternoon at Carlaw Park. Manukau had lost their round 1 match v Devonport by default. The score for the City v Newton round 10 match was not reported, neither was the round 13 match between Richmond and Newton, and the round 14 match between Manukau and Newton also had no score reported. In round 14 Richmond defeated City by default. The 12th round was washed out completely meaning only 13 rounds were played. A 15th round was scheduled on September 5, but there were no results reported indicating the round was not played.
{|
|-
|

Reserve grade fixtures

Stallard Cup (reserve and senior B knockout)
Following the conclusion of the senor reserve and senior B competitions the competitions combined for the second year in a row to compete for the Stallard Cup in a knockout competition. Papakura by winning the senior B competition had been invited to compete for the Roope Rooster, and Otahuhu and Waiuku did not field teams in the Stallard Cup. This meant that just Green Lane and Point Chevalier joined the reserve grade sides. Point Chevalier beat Manukau in round 1, and then received a bye in the second week. They were defeated by Marist in the major semi-final, with Marist progressed to the final where they played Richmond, who had had a bye into the final. Marist won by 13 points to 12 at Carlaw Park. The Green lane senior B side was defeated by City in the first round.

Senior B competitions

Senior B grade standings (Sharman Cup)
Point Chevalier were coached by Sonny Hing once again and captained by Archie Lane. They finished third in the championship but won the knockout competition.
{|
|-
|

Sharman Cup results
Green Lane had a player ruled out of order after their match with Otahuhu in round 2 but they were defeated 5-2 anyway. In round 4 Waiuku defeated Papakura 7-6 however they fielded C. Bright (formerly of Newton) and he had not been regraded. Waiuku were under the impressions that he was free to play for them as he had not played at all in 1935. The ARL said that it was an unfortunate technicality but they had to adhere to the rules and the match was awarded to Papakura.

Walmsley Colts Shield
After the round 1 match between Waiuku and Green Lane the later team was asked by the ARL why they had fielded a player who was not on the team sheet. There was no score published in the newspapers but the breach of the rules indicates that Waiuku won. Green Lane also fielded an ineligible player in their round 6, 0–0 draw with Point Chevalier, so their opponents were awarded the match. Waiuku would have played Papakura in the final but they could not muster a team and defaulted the match.

Results

Foster Shield Knock-out
Point Chevalier and Green Lane played a ‘knock-out’ competition match with Point Chevalier winning by 22 points to 9. Papakura had been admitted into the Roope Rooster competition and both Waiuku and Otahuhu had defaulted their recent matches leaving only two senior B teams to contest.

Other Club Matches and Lower Grades

Senior club matches

Hawke's Bay v Mount Albert
In September Mount Albert travelled to Hawke's Bay to take on the local representative side and were victorious 20-16.

Taumarunui v Manukau
On September 19 Manukau played the local Taumarunui side in Manunui as apart of an effort to revive the sport in the area. Manukau won in the last minute 30-28. Messrs. D. Wilkie and I. Stonex represented the Auckland Rugby League on the trip. It was hoped that the sport could be established "on a sound footing" from Ōtorohanga to Raetihi.

Taumarunui v Richmond
On September 26 Richmond also paid a visit to Taumarunui and beat the local side 24-22 before "a good attendance". The Richmond 4th Grade side went down to a "heavy" local team in the curtain-raiser 20-16.

Lower grade competitions
There were 6 lower grades in 1936 and an additional 3 schoolboy grades.
Grades and trophy winners were as follows:
Second Grade: R.V. Club won the 2nd Grade championship (Hayward Shield), and Mount Albert won the knockout competition (Monteith Shield). Competing teams were Manukau Rovers, Richmond, R.V. (Alex Harvey & Sons Ltd company club team), Glenora, and Mount Albert.
Third Grade: Ellerslie won the third grade championship (Benson Cup), while City won the knock out competition (Murray Cup) when they defeated Manukau 29-18 on October 31. W. Pengally of the Ponsonby side was awarded Mr. J.F.W. Dickson's medal for the most sportsmanlike player in the grade. Competing teams were Marist, Otahuhu, Richmond, Northcote, Ponsonby, City, Newton A, Newton B, Glenora, Point Chevalier A, Point Chevalier B, Papakura, Green Lane, R.V., Manukau Rovers, Ellerslie, and Devonport.
Fourth Grade: City won the fourth grade championship (Hospital Cup) and the knock out competition (Kiwi Shield). Competing teams were: Mount Albert, Ellerslie, Ponsonby, Richmond, Marist, Point Chevalier A, Devonport, Manukau Rovers, and City.
Fifth Grade: Glenora won the fifth grade championship (Endean Shield), with Otahuhu winning the knockout competition (Milicich Cup). Competing teams were Richmond, Papakura, Newton, Glenora, Northcote, Otahuhu, Devonport, and Manukau Rovers.
Sixth Grade:  The sixth grade championship (Rhodes Shield) was won by Richmond, with City winning the knock-out competition (Hammill Cup). Competing teams were Richmond, Green Lane, City, Avondale, and Papakura.
Seventh Grade: Otahuhu won the seventh grade championship (Myers Cup), the knock out competition (Oval Shield), and Walmsley Miniature Shield for a special round were both shared by Richmond and City. Competing teams were Ellerslie, Otahuhu, Glenora, Richmond, Northcote, Marist, City, and Point Chevalier.
The Points Shields were won by Richmond (Davis Shield) in the open competition for all clubs, while the trophy for just junior clubs was won by Otahuhu (Tracy Inglis’ trophy).

Schoolboy competitions
A trophy (Bennet Uniform Cup) was presented for the best team in regards to their “playing equipment and general good conduct”. Referees would award the teams points each week and it was open to all sides in Auckland including senior teams. The final points were as follows: Northcote 28.41, Mount Albert (Intermediate) 28.09, Newton 26.81, Mount Albert (seniors) 26.33, Marist 26.25, Green Lane 26, Richmond (seniors) 25.3, Ellerslie 25.09, Richmond (Intermediate) 25.09, Ponsonby 24.5, Balmoral 23.89, Otahuhu 23.36, Manukau Rovers 23.3, Avondale 22.66, Devonport 22.

The following were the winning teams in each section: 
Senior championship (L. Rout Challenge Trophy), Richmond; knockout (new trophy) Devonport; 
Intermediate championship (Newport Shield) and seven-a-side (Robert Reid Memorial Shield) Richmond (with a 10 win, 2 loss season record, for 39, against 3); Intermediate runners-up (Eccles Memorial Shield) and knock out (Ernest Davis Cup), Marist; seven-a-side runners-up (Walmsley Midget Shield), Ellerslie.

Senior championship standings
{|
|-
|

Intermediate competition standings
{|
|-
|

Junior championship standings
{|
|-
|

Auckland representative team
Prior to the selection of the selectors for the season Newton Rangers proposed that the representative selector or selectors should have no other position in the game. This was referred to the clubs for eventual decision at the annual general meeting. At the control board meeting on May 13 it was confirmed that Bert Avery would be the sole selector for the Auckland team. He had been nominated by 6 of the 8 senior clubs. Auckland had planned to celebrate the Kings Birthday weekend with a A v B trial match and a match between Auckland and Auckland Maori. However Wellington intimated that they would like to play a match with Auckland on that weekend. The ARL then dropped the A v B match and instead scheduled one between Auckland and Wellington whilst still playing the Auckland v Auckland Māori match as well. The Auckland Rugby League set the ticket prices for the Auckland v England match at 2 shillings and 6 pence. But after many complaints from the clubs that it should not be the same price as a test match the price was lowered to 2 shillings.

Three Auckland players were to play representative football during the season however it was for neither Auckland nor New Zealand. The Northland team to play England required strengthening and so the selector E.J. Parkes chose George Kerr (Devonport), A.L. Haslam (Marist), and R Hollows (Devonport). The first two were former Northland players. At the same time the New Zealand first test team was chosen. Nine Auckland players were chosen for the first test with England. Jack Hemi, Len Scott, Wally Tittleton, Lou Brown, Tommy Trevathan, Arthur Kay, Roy Powell, Frank Pickrang, and Steve Watene. Notably the entire back division were Auckland players. For the second test Hemi was replaced by Claude Dempsey and Len Scott was replaced by Ted Mincham meaning that the backline was still composed entirely of Auckland players. Three more Auckland players strengthened the Taranaki side to play Great Britain also, they were Glover, Brimble, and one other unnamed in the papers. Glover was said to have given “an almost flawless display, and Brimble gave a remarkable exhibition as first five-eighth”.

Auckland (Pākēha) v Tamaki (Auckland Māori)
This was the first time an Auckland Māori side had played against an Auckland Pākēha side. Whilst it was named "Auckland" in 1936 and 1937 it was thereafter named Auckland Pākēha, or simply or "Pākēhas" in the newspapers.

Auckland v Wellington
Ross Jones debuted for Auckland.

Auckland A v Auckland B (trial match)

North Island v South Island (inter-island match)
During the match R Haslam was running with the ball when he began falling into a hole which had fallen into the ground. In the meantime he had passed the ball and play moved away but was forced to stop once the referee realised what had happened. It had formed near a drain where the water had washed away the soil beneath the ground. A ball boy was photographed standing in the hole ‘buried’ to his waist. The gate receipts for the match were £608 19/ with 15,000 in attendance at the match and the trial curtain-raiser.

Auckland v England
The Auckland team had been selected by Bert Avery and coached by Bert Cooke. Auckland competed well against a very strong England team before going down 22–16. Walter Cuthbert donated a trophy (a cap) for the best Auckland player which was selected by an Mr. R.F. Anderton, the touring teams co-manager as being Steve Watene. It was presented to him at the Auckland annual prize giving in November.

Auckland Junior representatives
The Auckland school representative team travelled to Whangarei to play. The match was a 3–3 draw which meant that the Auckland side retained the Golden Bloom banner.

Auckland representative matches played and scorers

Tāmaki (Auckland Māori) representative team
The Tāmaki team were selected by Ernie Asher. Tāmaki played their first match of the season on June 15 against a Waikato Māori side at Te Kohanga. They lost 43-30 though there was no significant reporting of the match and no scorers or team lists were published. They then played a match for the Waitangi Shield against Takahiwai (Northland Māori) on July 15. The Waitangi Shield had been made by Mr. Harold Walmsley and was originally presented to Hawke's Bay. Taranaki Māori won it from them before losing it to Tāmaki who had held it in recent seasons. The City Rovers side supplied 4 players to the team. City had recruited many Māori players over previous seasons, particularly drawing them from outside Auckland. The newly formed Manukau senior side provided an amazing eight players to the side during the course of the season. This was due to the influence of Steve Watene who had moved from City Rovers to the Manukau side and been part of the recruiting process of Māori players such as Jack Hemi. One very notable inclusion in the side was Ted Brimble. Notable for the fact that he was not Māori. He was the brother of Walter Brimble and Wilfred Brimble. The three brothers had an English father and a Basutu mother, from Africa.

Waikato Māori v Tāmaki
A mid week match was played between Waikato Māori and Tāmaki on June 15 at Te Kohanga however no individual scoring was reported. The only Tāmaki players named as appearing in the match were L Kawe, Steve Watene, and Lou Brown. Jack Hemi was said to have missed the game through his injury sustained playing for Manukau.

Tāmaki v Takahiwai (Northland Māori) (Waitangi Shield)

Tāmaki v Waikato Māori
This match was scheduled to be played for the Waitangi Shield at Carlaw Park on July 29 however the weather had been particularly bad during mid winter and the Carlaw Park surface was in fairly poor condition. As a result, the Auckland Rugby League cancelled the match when the weather in that weekend was bad and they wished to protect the surface from further damage prior to the first test between New Zealand and Great Britain due to be played 10 days later.

Tāmaki (Auckland Māori) representative matches played and scorers
The match with Waikato Māori only saw 3 players named so the appearance statistics are incomplete and the 30 points scored by the side was not attributed to any individual players.

Rugby league annual ball
On October 7 the Auckland Rugby League held their fourth annual ball at the Peter Pan Cabaret. The venue was decorated with blue, black, and white, the colours of Auckland and New Zealand. Tables were also decorated in the colours of the clubs. Arrivals were greeted by the chairman of the ladies committee, Mrs. Ivan Culpan, and Mr. A. Ferguson, chairman of the ball committee.

Annual General Meetings and Club News
Auckland Rugby League Junior management committee The junior management committee held a meeting on February 26 in order to begin arranging the season's programme as early as possible. They decided to hold their annual meeting on March 17. It was also suggested that every senior club should be compelled to have at least three junior teams. They held their annual meeting at the A.R.L. boardroom on March 17 with chairman Mr. D. Wilkie presiding. It was reported that the previous season had 1,033 players registered with 810 in weighted grades. There were 56 teams. There were twelve nominations for the nine seats on the junior board and the sealed vote of the affiliated clubs resulted in the return of the 1935 members as follows: Messrs, D. Wilkie (chairman), E. Chapman, T. Chernside, A. Hopkinson, T. Carey, I. Stonex, R. Short, G. Taylor and C. Howe. A favourable recommendation was made for compulsory insurance and for an increase of the transfer fee to be paid by senior clubs taking junior players. It was also decided to start the season on May 2. At a meeting of the Junior Control Board on March 31 the Point Chevalier delegate pointed out that the Davis Points Shield for aggregate club points was “difficult to win by junior clubs not having senior teams”, and he “suggested that an additional trophy should be open to competition and confined to junior clubs”. The members agreed with the suggestion. The transfer fee for junior clubs losing players to senior clubs was increased from £1 to £2.

At the July 22 meeting it was discussed as to whether junior games should be postponed on the Saturday as Auckland was playing the touring Great Britain side. It was decided that the games should go ahead as they needed to progress the various competitions though an exception was made for the 2nd Grade as it was well advanced. The chairman said they were endeavouring to start the matches as early as possible in the morning. It was decided however that the junior grades would be suspended on the weekends of the first and second test as they were being played in Auckland.

Auckland Rugby League Primary School Management Committee: At a February 26 meeting of the ARL Mr. L. Rout, secretary of the schools’ management, said it was proposed to extend the competition to include a grade for secondary school players. The co-operation of senior clubs with school teams was invited. ARL Chairman, G. Grey Campbell said that the schools competition had grown “remarkably and was a distinct asset” and “assured all that there would be no interference with any schoolboy as to what game he elected to play”.

They held their 11th annual meeting on March 23 with Mr. R.E. Newport presiding. Their report stated that there were “11 teams in the championship and eight in the seven-a-side tournament, the season had proved most successful and a pronounced advance on the previous year”. It was hoped that a schoolboy team could be sent to the South Island to tour. The following officers were elected:- Patron, Dr. M.G. Pezaro; president, Mr. R.E. Newport; vice-presidents, last year's with the addition of Messrs. E. Bennett and R. Shaw, with power to add; hon. secretary, Mr. L. Rout; selector, Mr. S. Dickey.

On October 24 the schoolboys held a gala at Carlaw Park. A ten team seven-a-side tournament and running events were decided. Manukau won the seven-a-side tournament after defeating Ellerslie 3–0 in the final. A special seven-a-side match was played between Richmond A and Ngaruawahia with the Waikato side winning 9–0.

Auckland Rugby League Referees Association At an ARL meeting on February 26 Mr. L.E. Bull chairman of the Referees’ Association commended clubs on their sportsmanlike attitude to officials on the fields the previous season. He said that men who proved themselves capable players before the public had a good opportunity to valuably assist the game further in the ranks of the referees. The Referees’ Association presented a report in March thanking and congratulating numerous members. P. Rogers and Maurice Wetherill were congratulated on being appointed to referee international fixtures. Mr. R. Otto won the Carey Cup for merit and consistency on the field. At their annual meeting Mr. Les Bull was presiding as president. It was announced that Mr. W. Mincham was celebrating his 25th active year in the code and was congratulated accordingly. Regret was expressed at the resignation of Mr. Arthur Ball due to ill-health. It was also decided to ask the junior board to appoint official line umpires to co-operate on outer grounds. The officers elected were as follows:- President, Mr. Les Bull; vice-president, Mr. J.G. McCowatt; hon. secretary, Mr. W. Simpson; treasurer, Mr. A. Chapman; auditor, Mr. B. Emirali; delegate to the Auckland Board of Control, Mr. W. Mincham; delegate junior management committee, Mr. F. Thompson; delegate to NZ Referees’ Association, Mr. Bull; delegate to Referees’ Association, Mr. Bull; delegate to Referees’ Appointment Board and grading committee, Mr. A. Rae, Mr/ A. Sanders being elected as third man to the control board; executive, Messrs, Maurice Wetherill, T. Evans and R. Otto; social committee, Messrs. Mincham, Otto, Wetherill, and Sanders. At the ARL executive meeting on April 22 Mr. Les Bull was nominated the independent representative on the Referees’ Appointment Board. At their meeting on May 18 Mr. P. Rogers was appointed treasurer of the association, succeeding Mr. Emirali. On October 10 the referees held their annual picnic at Henderson Park. The Carey Cup for the most improved junior referee during the season went to Mr. G. Kelly. Mr. L.E. Bull was thanked for his service for many years as president. Various fun sports events were competed for by those in attendance.

Avondale Rugby League Football Club: Avondale fielded teams in the 6th Grade, the Intermediate Schoolboys Grade, and the Junior seven-a-side Grade.
City Rovers They held their annual meeting at the Auckland League rooms at 7:30 on Thursday, March 12. A “record attendance” was present with Mr. George Hunt presiding. Their 26th annual report mentioned that their senior team, though brilliant at times failed “ultimately through laxity of trainings”. The club had spent heavily on equipment and therefore only came out with a slight credit balance for the season. The following officers were elected:- Patron, Mr. Charles Raines; president, Mr. George Hunt; club captain, Mr. Ben Davidson; secretary and treasurer, Mr. Ernie Asher; assistant secretary, Mr. J. Counihan; auditor, Mr. E.H. Phelan; executive committee, Messrs, J. Sullivan, C. Raynes, J. Ragg and Lou Brown (seniors), J. Purdy (reserve grade), G. Miller (thirds), W. Martin (fourths), C. Nicholson (fifths), G.A. Dean (sixths), and S. Dickie (schoolboys); vice-presidents were re-elected with power to add. The club decided to support the remit that all senior teams must field at least three junior sides. Tuesday and Thursday evenings were chosen as training nights with the first general club practice set down for Saturday, March 21. City Rovers secured the services of Jack Rata, a well-known Te Kohanga, Franklin, and Waikato rugby player. On October 18 City held their annual picnic at Motuihi, travelling by the Baroona from the central wharf in the morning. On October 31 the City Rovers’ fourth grade championship team were guests at a dinner at the Royal Hotel with club chairman Mr. George Hunt presiding. Their coach, Mr. Chris Olsen, was presented with a club blazer, and Alan Legge received a gold medal as the most improved player. Earlier on the same day the City third grade side had won their knockout competition, defeating Manukau in the final 29–18 at Carlaw Park. It was the final match of rugby league for the 1936 season. Their annual prize giving was held at the Carlton Cabaret on the evening of December 9.

Devonport United Their annual meeting was held at Hellaby's Buildings in Devonport on Wednesday, March 11 at 7.45pm. Mr. A. Ferguson president of Devonport United presided over the meeting. Thanks was made to their coach Matt Scott, and to Mr. E. Johnson for his coaching of the senior reserve team. The following were elected officers:- Patron, Captain A.W.D. Meiklejohn; vice-patron, Messrs, E. Keely and J. Donald; president, Mr. A. Ferguson; vice-presidents, same as last year, with Messrs, E.H. Scott, L. Watson and J. Oliver; secretary and treasurer, Mr. M. Coghlan; club captain, Frank Bolger; school committee delegate, Mr. W. Aughton; executive committee, Messrs, N. Langton, M Scott, H. Mann, A.W. Seagar, H. Gerrard and P. Foster. Devonport was granted permission to pay Pukemiro (South Auckland) senior and junior teams on the North Shore on April 18 which would be the ‘opening day’ when other senior teams would be playing a special round of matches at Carlaw Park. They held a muster on April 4 on their home ground at Devonport. H Simpson, their representative forward injured his shoulder and was taken to Auckland Hospital.

Ellerslie United League Football Club Their annual meeting was held in the Parish Hall in Ellerslie and “drew the largest attendance for several years”. Mr. J. McInnarney presided over the meeting. It was said that the balance-sheet showed the club to be in a “very satisfactory position” and the club hoped to enter teams in the second and seventh grade competitions. The following were elected as officers:- Patron, Mr. W.J. Jordan, M.P.; president, Mr. J. McInnarney; vice-presidents, Messrs, R. McIsaacs, A. Chapman, J. Miller, F.E. Woodhams and J. Court, with power to add; club captain, Mr. F. Chapman; hon. secretary and treasurer, Mr. G. Whaley; committee, Messrs. O.D. Slye (chairman), J. Pinches, J. Ryan, R. Hunter, S. Pemberton, J. Welsh, H. Thomas, J. Crawford, A. Britton, T. Bevan and A. Tobin; hon. auditor, Mr. J. Carr. The Ellerslie delegate reported that ex-international Charles Gregory was now coaching their 3rd grade team. On July 21 the Ellerslie Town Board discussed the proposals for floodlighting on the Ellerslie Recreation Reserve for night training. It was decided that the board be responsible for the installation and maintenance of one floodlight on condition that the Ellerslie RL club and the amateur athletic club agree to meet the cost of installing and maintaining one light. Or alternatively that each club installs one light each and pays an additional ground fee of £2 15s annually. On October 31 Ellerslie officials, players and supporters gathered at the Returned Soldiers Hall to honour the third grade team which had won the Auckland championship. Mr. O. Sly presided and presentations were made to Mr. G Whaley, and to Mr. Charles Gregory who was thanked for his coaching of the third grade team. Ellerslie took their seventh grade and schoolboy teams to Tui Glen for a picnic where races were run.

Glenora Rugby League Football Club Glenora held their annual meeting on March 9. The following officers were elected:- Patron, Mr. Chas. Robertson; vice-patrons, Messrs. H. Douglas and Frank Newton; president, Mr. J. Butterfield; vice-presidents, last year's list with several additions; chairman, Mr. W. McNeil; hon. secretary, Mr. W. McNamara; treasurer, Mr. A. Pearson. Glenora notified its intention to field a seventh grade team. Glenora held a dance on Tuesday May 12 at the Delta Theatre, New Lynn. There were about “125 couples” participating in the evening. Messrs. W. Probert, D. Wilkie and other representatives of various ARL boards were present and congratulated the club on their progress. In late October Glenora held a “social gathering to wind up the season” and Mr. A. Bow, the coach of the 5th grade team which had won the championship, received a trophy in recognition of his services. On December 5 Glenora held their end of season grand presentation dance at the Delta Theatre in New Lynn. The club secretary, Mr. McNamara thanked all members and followers for their support. Mr. Bill Hindman was presented with the Endean Shield and the ARL caps to the fifth grade team who won the championship.

Green Lane Rugby League Club They held their first ever annual meeting on February 27 with about 50 members in attendance. Mr. W. E. Kane presided over the meeting. Their annual report mentioned that a senior B team was entered in the latter part of the 1935 season and they should be stronger in the future. They elected the following officers:- Patron, Dr. M.G. Pezaro; president, Mr. M. Duffin; vice-presidents, same as last year, with power to add; committee Messrs. W.E. Kane, J. Lawrence, L. Hart, O. Wilson, P. Dunn; hon. secretary, Mr. A. Wilson; hon treasurer, Mr. M. Duffin; club captain, F. Hulme; senior selector, Mr. D. Bird; junior selector, Mr. J. Silva; auditors, Messrs. W.O. Carlaw and J. Hardwick. Green Lane informed the Junior Control Board on March 31 that it had secured its own ground and intended to hold a local opening day on May 2. They were however using the racecourse ground and sharing it with the rugby union side there. On June 26 committee member Mr. William Edward Kane met with a very bad accident at the railway yards. He was loading a truck when another which was being shunted struck him from behind crushing his right leg so badly that it needed to be amputated. The Green Lane club wrote to the ARL informing them of the accident and that they would need to replace him on their board as he recovered. At a meeting of the junior management committee on August 25 Mr. Kane made an appearance after recovering from his injury. He received “a hearty welcome”.

Manukau Rugby League Football Club On February 16 Manukau held their club picnic at Eastern Beach. Several aquatic games were played and a sports programme run. They held a carnival on their new grounds at Albert Street, Onehunga on the 19th, 20th and 21 March to raise funds for training sheds and other improvements. At a meeting in late March with Mr. H.E. Kemp presiding a report was tabled that an ideal site for a ground in Onehunga had been acquired and training sheds would be erected. The club was in a “sound financial position as the result of reorganisation and profitable off-season social activities, and [they] now sought senior status with sound senior and reserve grade sides for competition”. They planned to enter teams in every junior grade and alongside school teams in the Auckland competition they would organise a local competition between six schools in the district. At the control board meeting on April 1 Manukau sent a deputation of Messrs. F. House (president) and C. Cowan (secretary) to apply for senior status. The application was deferred for urgent consideration. At the New Zealand Council's meeting on July 30 the transfer of T Toki from Northland to Manukau in Auckland was brought up. Northland said that it was a clear case of “poaching”. Mr. C. A. Snedden said that the ARL needed to acquaint itself with all the circumstances first. Mr. W. Liversidge then said that the ARL could not deal with the matter as it was between the Manukau club and Northland. After the conclusion of the competitive season Manukau defeated a combined thirteen which included several juniors at a match at Onehunga.

Marist Brothers Old Boys League Football Club Marist held their annual meeting at 7.45pm at the Rugby League Rooms on Wednesday, March 4. Mr. J. Sayegh presided over the meeting. They thanked their coaches from the previous season who were Charles Gregory (senior), G. Batchelor (senior reserve), Mullarvy and Thompson (third grade), Bakalich and Mudford (schoolboys), and McElwain, Delihoyde and Fletcher. It was recommended by the outgoing committee that Jim Laird who had spent several months in hospital with water on the knee should receive a benefit match to help compensate him. The club reported that it was in a strong financial position with a credit balance of £168 13/6. The following officers were elected:- Patron, the Rev. Dr. M. J. Liston; president, Mr. J. Sayegh; vice-presidents, same as last year, with power to add; committee, Messrs. J. Regan, Wheaton, W. Madigan, G. Batchelor, J. Ball, W.J.B. McElwain, J. Flynn; hon, secretary, Jack Kirwan; treasurer, P. Fletcher; club captain, Hec Brisbane; J.M.C delegate, Mr. M. Thompson. Towards the end of the meeting Messrs. M.J. Moodabe and J. Molloy who representing the Marist Old Boys Association urged Marist to affiliate with the organisation. A decision was left for the incoming committee to decide later.

Mount Albert United Rugby League Football Club On Saturday, April 29 Mount Albert arranged a welcome home evening at the Titirangi Kiosk for former player Mr. L.J. Schultz who had returned from England where he had been playing professionally for York since late 1934.  It was unclear if he would be able to play for Mount Albert as his contract with York had not been completed but after the club cabled the English Council for information they were told that he was able to play. Mount Albert held their annual meeting at King George's Hall on Monday, March 2, at 8pm. Over 60 members and “friends” attended the meeting with Mr. A.C. Gallagher presiding. He said that for a draw with Devonport United the club “might have created a world’s record in the game by winning a senior premiership in its first year”. Their eighth report said more was needed to be done to build up the junior grades throughout the district. The club had fielded 5 teams and was coached by J. Johnson and selected by Tom Haddon. The medal for best forward went to H. Flannagan and for most improved back to B. Schultz. R. Morrissey won Mr. Cates cap for best goal kicker. The club reported that it was in a strong financial position with a credit balance of over £130. They elected the following as their officers:- Patron, Mr. R. Ferner, Mayor of Mount Albert; vice-patron, Mr. A.C. Gallagher; vice-presidents last year's with power to add; secretary, Mr. H.G. Shaw: treasurer, Mr. B.W. Davis: club captain, Mr. F. Martin; auditor, Mr. J.C. Johnstone. They thanked their retiring secretary Mr. T. Mooney, and also Clarrie McNeil, their centre who was departing to live in Wellington. The club decided to begin training at the Morningside ground on March 7. In a practice game on April 4 Mount Albert beat Ponsonby 11–8 at Fowld's Park. In mid-October Mount Albert held their annual prize giving at the Manchester Unity Hall with “180 members and friends” in attendance. The Mayor of Mount Albert, Mr. H.A. Anderson presided. The club was congratulated by ARL Chairman Mr. G. Grey Campbell on winning the senior reserve championship and winning the second grade knockout. The president's trophy for official service to the club was won by Mr. H.G. Shaw, secretary. The special trophy of Mr. Richards for the best club player giving attention to training and other points, and open to all grades, went to L. Slattery of the second grade side. Other trophies presented were: Most improved senior player during the season, J. Schultz; reserve grade, E. Dunn; best all-rounder in the second grade, J. Patterson; best club senior schoolboy player, W. Greenhough; and best intermediate schoolboy, I. Sumich.

Newton Rangers Football Club They held their annual meeting on February 24 at the YMCA rooms. Their 26th annual report disclosed that the club's credit balance increased by £42 12/6, and that they recorded a considerable increase in membership. Mr. A.J. McGregor who had coached the senior side was thanked for his services. The following were elected officers:- Patron, Mr. Matt Hooper; vice patron, Mr. W. Monteith; president, Mr. J. A. Lee, M.P.; vice presidents, twenty-two re-elected, and Messrs. T. Jenyns, S. Watkins, A.E. Lovell, W.J. McGregor, T. Cohen, J. Cox; hon. secretary, Mr. W.E. Cloke; assistant secretary, Mr. G. Matthews; treasurer, Mr. P. Henry; committee, Messrs R. Baddiley, N. Preston, C. Turner, G. Steven, D. Grantley, G. Matthews and W. Dyer; property steward, Mr. S. Barker; club captain, Mr. J.A. Mason. The senior coach and selector was to be decided later. Mr. Baddiley announced that ex-Newton players Trevor Hall, Cyril Blacklaws, and Mortimer Stephens who were all playing for St Helens RFC were presenting a complete set of jerseys and sox, due to arrive for the seniors within the next few weeks. The club said that they intended on fielding two teams in the schools’ competition and two teams in the seven-a-side tournament. The organiser of this would be E.F. Hickey, who was made an ex-officio member of the committee. At a following meeting the following were appointed to the executive of the Newton club: Committee, Messrs. E.R. Baddiley (chairman), Barker, Dyer, Matthews, Preston, Steven, Grantly, Turner and Hickey; secretary, Mr. E.W. Cloke; treasurer, Mr. P. Henry; trustees, Messrs. Steven and Rutledge; club captain, Mr. J. A. Mason; selector-coach, Mr. A. J. McGregor. During the season Hon. W.E. Parry, M.P., Minister of Internal Affairs accepted the position of president of the Newton club. The office had been made vacant by the elevation of Mr. J.A. Lee, Under-Secretary to the Prime Minister, to the position of president of the Auckland Rugby League. Following a round 11 match A. Nathan, a Newton forward was involved in a dressing room incident and was suspended by the league for the remainder of the season and all of 1937 with the suspension going to December 31. Newton held a special meeting in committee and reserved the decision arrived at for submission to the Auckland Rugby League management meeting. The appeal was later dismissed by the New Zealand Council. On October 28 Newton had an evening for its schoolboy players at the Paget Hall in Ponsonby. Roy Baddiley, the committee chairman welcomed those in attendance. Mr. G. Grey Campbell presented medals to Tom Graydon, Allan Waters, Albert Moyle (most improved player), Dawson Donaldson, Sydney White, Allan Leaning, Robert McCready, and Jock Sorby. The boys presented their delegate Mr. C. Moyle with a wristlet watch, and Mr. Baddiley an enlarged group photograph of the combined teams.

Northcote and Birkenhead Ramblers Football Club The club communicated to the Junior Control Board on March 31 that the club had a credit balance of £18 and had registered 15 new players. The Northcote Borough Council agreed with the Ramblers’ club that it should share the Stafford Road ground for the season with the rugby club on alternate Saturdays. In June the Northcote club requested floodlighting be installed at Stafford Park. The Northcote Borough Council agreed to the request. A benefit dance was held in aid of Mr. R. Tapp who broke his leg during a match. The dance was held on Saturday night at the Forresters’ Hall, Devonport. Mr. Clyde E. Howley was in charge of the floor arrangements and gave a demonstration of the Argentine tango with Mrs. Howley. On August 20 the Northcote and Birkenhead Ramblers League Football Club held their 26th anniversary ball at the King's Theatre in Northcote.

Otahuhu Rovers R.L.F.C Prior to the commencement of the season the Otahuhu club complained strongly at the Otahuhu Borough Council's decision to grant exclusive playing rights to Sturges Park for the season to the Auckland Rugby Union. Mr. W Arnold said that league football interested in Otahuhu had not been treated fairly in past years, and Mr. W. Bright claimed that the league code should have a fair share of the playing rights. The Mayor, Mr. C.R. Petrie, M.P., said that the maintenance costs of the ground were a burden on ratepayers and that the Otahuhu club representative had told a conference the previous August that a charge of £1 a match for the ground was unreasonable and that the council had received no contact from the club since this time. He went on to say that the council was anxious to assist the league code and “would endeavour, if desired, to make Princes Street reserve or Murphy’s Park available. After some “brisk exchanges” the mayor offered to inspect and consider the suitability of the other two parks for the use of league players and this was excepted by the Otahuhu club's delegation. On March 5 the Auckland Rugby League voiced their displeasure at the council's decision. Mr. G. Grey Campbell and Mr. E.J. Phelan were accompanied by officials of the Otahuhu club. Campbell said “the league people feel that an injustice has been done, as they were not advised that the council was prepared to consider tenders”. In previous years the council had asked clubs to make applications for the use of the ground and that from the date of the conference in 1935 in August when charges for the park were only suggested and discussed, the “league officials had received no further word until the press report of the council’s agreement with the union”. Mayor Petrie reiterated what he had said previously that the council saw that the park was being commercialised for sport and that they had decided to “fix definite charges” and that “he had expected to hear some feasible scheme advanced. Instead there had been nothing but criticism”. Bright and Campbell spoke further but the mayor declared that he “won’t have any more criticism” and a short time later the deputation departed.

The attendance at their annual meeting on March 11 was said to be “easily the best for a number of years”. Mr. J. Clark occupied the chair. The club was said to be in a “highly satisfactory” financial position. There was a lengthy discussion on the allocation of the local playing area given the recent controversy over the allocation of Sturges Park exclusively to the rugby union. They decided to nominate teams in the senior B, third intermediate, fourth grade, fifth grade and schoolboys’ competitions. The following were elected officers:- Patron, Mr. W.W. Massey; president, Mr. J. Nicholson; vice-presidents, same as last year, with the addition of Messrs, W. Speedy and W. Baxter, with power to add; chairman, Mr. Jim Clark; secretary, Mr. W. Hart; treasurer, Mr. W. Bright; committee, Messrs, W. McManus, J. Graham, W. Gordon, M. Clark, Trevena, W. Whitelaw, M. Ritchie, W. Lockhart, and C. Finlayson. At the control board meeting on April 1, Otahuhu advised that it had arranged an ideal ground in Princess Street, Otahuhu and its request for goal posts was granted. Otahuhu claimed transfer fees for several players at the May 19 junior management meeting. They included R. Halsey and M. Hucker (to Mount Albert), R. Philp and G Whye (to Manukau), and K. Finlayson (to Marist). These transfer fee requests were all referred to the senior board.

Papakura Rugby League Football Club Pakakura held their annual meeting in early March with Mr. S.H. Godden presiding. The officers elected were: Patron, Mr E.C. Foote; president, Mr H.A. Pollock; vce-presidents, Messrs C. Spencer, L. McVeagh, C. Chhamberlain, F.J. Verner and V. Hardwick; executive, Messrs G. Wilson, V. Ashby, C. Spencer, W. Elliot and L. Mcveigh; club captain, Mr. E.B. Pope; treasurer, Mr R. Walsh; social commit, Messrs Hawley, E. Ashby, R. Richardson, J. McInnes, A. Verner, junior, and H.T. McDonald; grounds committee, Messrs Wellm, A. Hill, A. McVeagh and King; hon. physicians, Drs. G.W. Lock and H. Burrell; auditor, Mr W.K. Francis, junior. Mr H.D. Spinley moved a vote of thanks to the outgoing president for his valuable services. The financial statement showed a credit of £35 5s. Their last season membership totalled 73 players and honorary members. It was also discussed that many members were disinterested in training nights and they were a “farce”, and that “payment of club fees was disregarded by more than two-thirds of the players”. Papakura applied for the use of Prince Edward Park to the Papakura Town Board on March 23 and stated a desire to beginning practice on the following Saturday.

The cost for installing floodlights at Prince Edward Park for the Papakura club to train under was estimated at £28 by the council. They intended to inform the club to see if they were prepared to pay a portion a rent for the ground to assist with the cost. On April 14 the Papakura town board at their meeting stated that the league club had suggested that two floodlights be erected at Prince Edward park. The cost of each would be £14, including £2 for installation. Mr. H.D. Spinley suggested that “the club pay for one light each. The club had plenty of money, its funds being obtained from Auckland”. It was decided to advise the club and ask for their comments. They also planned to ask the Auckland Electric Power Board for the cost of erecting a special floodlight in Queen Street in Papakura to light the playing area in the park, and also whether a slot-meter could be installed. On April 27 at the Papakura Town Board meeting it was virtually decided to install a floodlight where Cooke Street and Queen Street meet which would light up the new portion of the park for practices with a meter being installed. On April 23 the Papakura club held a dance in the Regent Theatre which in spite of bad weather was a “success”. After the supper adjournment Mr. Ben Davidson, ex-New Zealand player presented the Foster Memorial Shield to the captain (Mr. E. Pope) of the Papakura senior B team which the team had won 4 out of 5 times. They were also presented with the Walmsley Shield. Papakura secured Ben Davidson as their coach. He intended to travel from Auckland out to Papakura each Wednesday evening and to do so voluntarily. On June 10 Papakura held a club dance at the Regent Theatre that “attracted one of the largest crowds seen at a local dance for some time”. Music was supplied by Shalfoon's orchestra. The Papakura Town Board decided that the rugby league club should pay a sum of not less than £5 annually for the use of Prince Edward Park. The club held their carnival dance at the Regent Theatre on August 28 with it crowded to almost capacity with about 300 present. Music was supplied by Epi Shalfoon's orchestra For the Roope Rooster match with Manukau on September 12 the Papakura side fielded three Burgess brothers, two Francis brothers, and two Taylor brothers. The Papakura club held their annual ‘smoke’ concert in the Regent theatre in Papakura. The building was “packed” and featured music from the S.S. Remuera orchestra led by Mr. Alan Dunker. Numerous people spoke about the administration of the game, the state of the club, and various other matters. On November 28 the Papakura club held their annual picnic at Mr. N.J. Sutherland's farm in south Clevedon. There were nearly 500 people in attendance who had been transported to the venue in “fleets of motor lorries”. Various races were held for different age groups and at the conclusion the president of the club, Mr. H. Pollock presented prizes, and Mr. Les McVeagh awarded a silver cup to R. Burgess for winning the cub championship 100 yard race.

Point Chevalier League Football Club At a meeting of the Junior Control Board on March 31 the Point Chevalier delegate said that the club hoped to enter seven teams.
Ponsonby United Football Club On February 7 the Ponsonby club along with the Ponsonby Boys’ Band, and the Ponsonby Swimming Club held a parade in the evening in Ponsonby. The parade was from the Herne Bay terminus to the Three Lamps and featured three beauty ‘queens’. The parade was to raise money for the three organisations. On March 27 the club held a “sing-song at the Leys Institute” with Mr. G. Grey Campbell leading the “happy hour”. They then held a collection at their pre-season senor match with Mount Albert at Fowld's Park on April 4. The Ponsonby Queen Carnival concluded on Thursday, April 9 and had raised over £600 to be shared equally between the Ponsonby Boys’ Band, the Ponsonby Swimming Club, and the Ponsonby RL club. The Ponsonby RL Queen, Miss Irene Robertson placed third in voting with 41,882.

Bert Cooke was appointed the coach and selector of the Ponsonby United club for the 1936 season after he had retired from playing with Richmond Rovers the previous year. Prior to Ponsonby's round 7 match they secured the services of Ernest Alfred Neale, who had represented Wellington and Auckland at rugby union. On September 5 the Ponsonby 3rd grade team travelled to Whangarei to play the Northland Junior side (Under 11 stone). Northland Juniors won 5 points to 0. In late November the Ponsonby club held a children's fancy dress dance in their clubrooms.

Richmond Rovers Football Club They held their annual meeting on Thursday, April 5 at 8pm in the Gaiety Hall, Surrey Crescent in Grey Lynn. President Mr. B.W. Davis said that “the club had a record championship year, but the management expected every team to win in 1936”. The club fielded ten grade teams and two 7-a-side school teams. They won the senior championship and champion of champions, second, fifth, sixth and seventh grade championships and knock-out, and the school championship. They also won the Davis Points Shield for the most aggregate points in the juniors. The senior teams success was attributed “a great deal” to the coaching of Mr. Thomas McClymont. The report stated that the balance-sheet showed a credit of £184 19/5. The following officers were elected:- Patron, Mr. W.J. Holdsworth; vice-patron, Mr. J. Redwood; president, Mr. B.W. Davis; chairman, Mr. W.A. Swift; hon. secretary and treasurer, Mr. W.R. Dick; delegate to primary schools’ management, Mr. C. Rowe; club captain, Mr. R. Hyland; auditor, Mr. Redwood. The existing vice-presidents were re-elected with several other nominations. The Harry Johns Cup (named after a Richmond player who had tragically died after injuries suffered from boxing) was awarded to the Richmond schoolboys team who won 19 games, lost 3, drew 3 and scored 539 points for and only 70 against. Life membership medallions were presented to Messrs. F. Thompson (17 years’ service to the club), Ralph Jenkinson (18) and W. Berger (15).

R.V. Rugby League Football Club: On the evening of February 19 the club held their annual meeting. They elected Mr. E. Muller as chairman; patron, Mr. A. G. Harvey; vice presidents, Mr. D Harvey, Mr. W. Harvey, sen., Mr. W Harvey, jun., Mr. A Harvey, jun., Mr. J McGehan, Mr. Hamilton, Mr. E. Griffiths; secretary, Mr. F. W. Day; treasurer, Mr. C. Smith; committee (two represent each factory), Victoria Street, R. Parr, E. Knight, Albert Street, A. Cloke, J Salter, King's Drive, J Taberner, L. Simpson; selector, trainer, A. Cloke; delegate, Mr. R. Parr; deputy-delegate, Mr. J. Taberner; official linesman, J. Salter; ball custodian, R. Shearer.

Waiuku Rugby League Football Club: Waiuku beat Papakura in a round 4 match but lost the match as they had fielded C. Bright who was not registered with them. Bright hadn't played in 1935 and was a free agent but he needed to be regraded from senior A to senior B to be eligible. A week later they complained to the ARL that Manukau had taken their senior B halfback (Mahema) to Carlaw Park to play for them instead of being at the Waiuku game. They had since allowed the player a transfer. The senior board of control felt that it was unfair to lose points on a technicality and said that a replayed match might be fairer and this was suggested for the junior control board to consider.

Senior grade registrations and transfers
At their annual meeting on 24 February Newton Rangers announced the following new players, C. Watson (Northern Wairoa Rugby Union rep.) and J. Ginders (ex-Richmond), R. Merrick (North Auckland rep.), and R. Robinson (ex-Taranaki rep).

At their annual general meeting Marist nominated the following new playing members, Norman Boyd (N.S.W. rep forward from Leeton), John Anderson (from the Blackball club on the West Coast), Blake (ex-Wellington), Breed (Otahuhu), and Rennie.

At Richmond's annual meeting they welcomed George Tittleton to the club who was a New Zealand representative who had previously been playing in the Waikato.

At their annual meeting City Rovers nominating the following new players: T.C. Allen (ex-Auckland rugby union rep), R.H. Dawson, S. Tipene (Panmure), and Harry Wayne was welcomed back from Taranaki.

At the board of control meeting on April 1 G. Kerr was transferred from Newton Rangers to Ellerslie. K. Massey (Devonport) was reinstated and 18 applications were made for senior registration. R.L. Merrick of the City club in Whangarei transferred to Newton Rangers.

On April 15 at the board of control meeting the following transfers and registrations occurred. H. Crook (Devonport), subject to Newton approval, A.C. Miller (Devonport), from City Rovers; A.C. Greenwood (Devonport), from Otahuhu; Robert L. Merrick (Newton), approved by Northland and the New Zealand Council; J.L. Wall (Ellerslie), to Newton; A.G. Kennedy, of Hobsonville, A.H. Forbes (Kumeu) and T.G. Jordan (Northcote) to Devonport. Transfers:- K. Finlayson, Otahuhu thirds, to Marist Old Boys’ senior reserves; R.G. Aro, Ponsonby to Marists; Norman Boyd, Marists to Ponsonby. Clearances:- R. White (Pukemiro), to Newton; George Tittleton and Wally Tittleton, Taupiri to Richmond, approved by South Auckland. J. O’Brien's registration from Huntly with Mount Albert was referred back to South Auckland. Arnold Porteous was reinstated and allowed to play for City Rovers.

At the ARL executive meeting on April 22 the following registrations were accepted: M. Simms (Devonport), A. McGill (Devonport), Wally Tittleton (Richmond), George Tittleton (Richmond), C.J. Glasgow (Newton), E.A. Morgan (Ponsonby), A.J. Watkins (Mount Albert). Leonard L. Knock was reinstated and registered with Newton. The following transfer were approved: H. Crook, Newton to Devonport; A. Wicks, Devonport to R.V.; F.R. Halsey, Otahuhu to Mount Albert; M. Hucker, Otahuhu to Mount Albert; V. Barchard, City to Marist.

From the April 29 meeting the following transfers were approved:- R. Middleton (Newton to Ponsonby); George A. Kerr (Newton to Devonport); Arnold O. Porteous (Newton to City); W. Cuff (Mount Albert to Newton); Midgley (Ponsonby), subject to regrade, Dunn (Ellerslie) and Shippe (Mount Albert), to Green Lane. Ponsonby informed the league that R. Bright and Lou Hutt had been granted transfers to Newton. Other players registered were W. Barlow, T. Allen (City), S.J. Davis, N.L. Parris (Ponsonby), R.L. Haslam, R. Aro, John Anderson (Marist). Arnold Porteous and Leonard L. Knock's re-instatements were approved.

On May 6 the following registrations were approved:- E.A. Jones (Grey Lynn), J. Greenwood (Ponsonby), K Fletcher (Mount Eden), to Richmond; R. Farrington (Eden Terrace) to Ponsonby; H.A. McCarthy (Ponsonby) and W.N. Paine, subject to clearance from Pirates, West Coast, to City; G.L. Breed (Otahuhu, to Marist Old Boys. Clearances:- John Anderson (Marist) from West Coast; H.R. Hadley (Richmond), from NSW; R.O. Jones (Ponsonby), from Wellington; Jack Whye (Manukau), from Otahuhu, subject to registration. Reinstatement:- J. Rutherford (Onehunga) to Manukau, subject to transfer from City. Transfers:- H.R. Smith, Point Chevalier to Richmond; R. Philp, Otahuhu to Manukau; A.C. Greenwood, Otahuhu to Devonport.

On May 12 J.T. Silva was granted a transfer from Ellerslie to the Green Lane senior B team. The transfer of J. Kelly from Otahuhu to Green Lane was referred to the senior board while the transfer of E.J. Ginders from Green Lane to Newton was referred back to the board, as Ginders was not considered to come under the rule as applying to junior players.

On May 20 F. Flavell was granted a transfer from Waiuku senior B to Newton Rangers. The transfers of Wm. Tittleton from Taupiri to Richmond, and J.F. Wilton from Newton Rangers to Huntly were referred to the New Zealand Council.

The following players were granted transfers on May 27:- Reg Johnson (City to Manukau), D. Tuck (Newton to City), C. Spiro (Mount Albert to City), R. Smith (Devonport to Newton), and T. Pawson (Taupiri to Mt Albert – subject to appeal). H.N. Halliwell and Mervyn Lyon were registered to Mount Albert. N. Pell and C. Bright of Newton were regraded to the Waiuku Senior B team.

A.C. Miller of Grey Lynn registered with the Mount Albert senior reserves on June 3. J.A. Mackinnon of Grey Lynn registered with Newton, F. McR. Murray of Zingari-Richmond RU club in Dunedin registered, as did P. Mahima who was transferring from Waiuku to Manukau. James J. Shepherd applied for reinstatement after playing for the Hutt RU club in Wellington. He was seeking a clearance from his former City Rovers club to join Richmond.

On June 10 the following transfer was approved: R. Keesing from Ponsonby to Green Lane senior B. Clearances were granted for Carl von Lubbe from West Coast to Auckland; T. Pawson from South Auckland to Auckland; and C.W. Haydon from Wellington to Auckland. The following were registered: W.E. Robinson with Marist; A.W. Carter and J.H. Steele to Ponsonby. R.S. Pyke was regraded from City reserves to Papakura senior B.

On June 17 the following players were registered: J. Reeve to Marist; B. Donaldson to Mount Albert; Ernest A. Neale to Devonport; A.L. Beasley to Devonport; H.G. Shalfoon and L. Maddren to Ponsonby; and M. Grey to City. E.G. Williams was granted a transfer from the Kensington club in Whangarei to City subject to approval by the New Zealand Council.

On June 24 H. Perfect was registered with Marist. Ex-NZ international Craddock Dufty came out of retirement and registered with the City club pending approval from his former club Ellerslie. R.M. Farrell registered with Mount Albert. Tai Raymond, an ex-Bay of Plenty rugby union representative was registering with City, as were A. Dent who was joining from Northland, and R. Doonin (of Balmoral).

On July 8 L.G. Andrews and R.J. Hobbs registered with Newton subject to a transfer from Richmond; F. Moate (of Tokomaru Bay), and A.N. Finlayson (of Northland) registered with Marist. Phil Donovan was reinstated subject to approval by the New Zealand Council.

On July 14 F.C.H. Pope was transferred from City 3rd grade to Newton reserves. G. Phillips transferred from Manukau seniors to Otahuhu senior B, while R.A. Burrell transferred from Papakura to Otahuhu senior B.

The August 19 meeting of the board of control saw the transfer of J. Cooper of the Manaia club at Tuakau to the City Rovers. M. Proctor transferred from Manukau to Newton, while P. Serra from the Addington club in Christchurch joined the Marist Old Boys. N McKinney registered with Ponsonby, and E. McCarthy registered with City.

At the board of control meeting on August 26 R.B. Reed was registered with the Newton Rangers. A.D. Mitchell was reinstated and transferred from Richmond to Newton pending approval by the New Zealand Council.

On 29 August at the board meeting T. Lynch was registered with the City Rovers, A. Beyer with Richmond, Lance Evans (ex-Canterbury) with Mount Albert, and D.G. Black (ex Grafton club) with Ponsonby.

On September 9 the following players were registered : Walter P. Brimble with Manukau, Ivan Christoff to Newton, Clive Murdoch and Andrew F. Fletcher to Marist, Morrice D. Dalton to Richmond, Robert Loui, George Marsh and Norman Shalfoon to City. P. Minnix of the Manaia (Tuakau) transferred to City.

On September 16 Bernard J. Patten, Royce Davis, and W. Fleet were registered with the Manukau club. M. Grey was transferred from the City reserves to the Green Lane senior B side.

References

External links
 Auckland Rugby League Official Site

Auckland Rugby League seasons